Patrick Collison (born 9 September 1988) is an Irish billionaire entrepreneur. He is the co-founder and CEO of Stripe, which he started with his younger brother, John, in 2010. He won the 41st Young Scientist and Technology Exhibition in 2005 at the age of sixteen. In 2020, he founded Fast Grants to accelerate COVID-19-related science with Tyler Cowen.

Early life
Patrick Collison was born to microbiologist Lily and electronic engineer Denis Collison in 1988, and he and his brothers were brought up in the small village of Dromineer in County Tipperary. The eldest of three boys, he took his first computer course when he was eight years old, at the University of Limerick, and began learning computer programming at the age of ten.

Collison was educated in Gaelscoil Aonach Urmhumhan, Nenagh, before attending Castletroy College in Castletroy, County Limerick.

Career

Young Scientist
Collison entered the 40th Young Scientist and Technology Exhibition with his project on artificial intelligence (nicknamed 'Isaac' after Isaac Newton, whom Patrick admired), finishing as individual runner-up. He re-entered the following year, and won first place at the age of sixteen on 14 January 2005. His project involved the creation of Croma, a LISP-type programming language.

His prize of a €3,000 cheque and a trophy of Waterford Crystal was presented to him by President Mary McAleese. His younger brother Tommy participated with his project on blogging in the Young Scientist and Technology Exhibition in 2010.

Auctomatic
He attended Massachusetts Institute of Technology, but eventually dropped out in 2009 after starting businesses. In 2007, he set up software company 'Shuppa' (a play on the Irish word , meaning 'shop') in Limerick with his brother John Collison. Enterprise Ireland did not allocate funding to the company, prompting a move to California after Silicon Valley's Y Combinator showed interest, where they merged with two Oxford graduates, Harjeet and Kulveer Taggar, and the company became Auctomatic.

On Good Friday of March 2008, Collison, aged nineteen, and his brother, aged seventeen, sold Auctomatic to Canadian company Live Current Media, becoming millionaires. In May 2008 he became director of engineering at the company's new Vancouver base. Collison attributes the success of his company to his win in the Young Scientist and Technology Exhibition.

Stripe 
In 2010, Patrick co-founded Stripe, which in 2011 received investment of $2 million including from PayPal co-founders Elon Musk and Peter Thiel, and venture capital firms Sequoia Capital, Andreessen Horowitz, and SV Angel.

In November 2016, the Collison brothers became the world's youngest self-made billionaires, worth at least $1.1 billion, after an investment in Stripe from CapitalG and General Catalyst Partners valued the company at $9.2 billion.

In 2017, the brothers were worth at least $3.2 billion each after Stripe raised $150 million from CapitalG, an investment division of Google parent's company Alphabet, and General Catalyst Partners. 

In 2018, Stripe, under the direction of the Collison brothers, contributed $1 million to California YIMBY, a pro-housing development lobbying organization.

In September 2019, it was announced that Stripe had raised an additional $250 million at a valuation of $35 billion. Together, the brothers hold a controlling interest in Stripe and will be able to retain control should the company go public.

Other
Both Collison and his younger brother John were featured on a young Irish persons rich list aired on an RTÉ television show during the 2008 Christmas period.

On 18 July 2009, at the age of 20 and following the publication of McCarthy Report, Collison outlined his ideas for the future of Ireland on popular talk-show Saturday Night with Miriam.

According to Collison, he reads books and is interested in a broad range of subjects on history, technology, engineering, fiction, philosophy, and art. He publishes the list of books he read on his website. In November 2018, Collison published a piece in The Atlantic with Michael Nielsen entitled Science is Getting Less Bang for its Buck, arguing that increased investment in science hasn't produced commensurate output. In 2019, Collison published an opinion piece in the same outlet with Tyler Cowen arguing for a new academic discipline called "Progress Studies", which would study the cultural and institutional conditions which lead to the most progress and higher standards of living.

On 29 June 2020 Collison criticized the Chinese governments treatment of Uighurs tweeting: "As a US business (and tech) community, I think we should be significantly clearer about our horror at, and opposition to, the atrocities being committed by the Chinese government against its own people".

Collison lives in San Francisco, California.

Forbes article
A profile of the brothers published in Forbes in 2021 claimed the brothers had "escaped" from Limerick, describing it as a "warzone" because of a gang feud and it was "the 'murder capital' of Europe". It claimed "shootings, pipe bomb attacks, and stabbings" happened there every night. It also claimed that "Some bad neighbourhoods are even walled off by a dirty graffitied 10-foot-high barrier, like the Berlin Wall".

The article received a lot of publicity online, causing a backlash. Patrick tweeted "Not only mistaken about Limerick but the idea of ‘overcoming’ anything is crazy. We are who we are because we grew up where we did". John tweeted it was "daft". Patrick O'Donovan called on the magazine and author to apologise to the people of Limerick "or the insult and hurt caused" by it. He also tweeted "I am calling on them to come to Limerick where I will gladly set the record straight in respect of what our county and city has to offer as opposed to what your work of fiction depicts," and "Please let me know when suits to visit." Niall Collins tweeted that the article was a "disgraceful description of Limerick, home to so many fine and decent people".

The article was removed from the website on 9 April 2021.

Personal life
In April 2022, Collison married Swiss-American biochemist Silvana Konermann with whom he co-founded the Arc Institute. Collison met Konnermann during the 2004 EU Young Scientist competition.

References

External links

1988 births
Living people
Irish billionaires
Irish computer programmers
Irish scientists
People educated at Castletroy College
Businesspeople from County Limerick
Y Combinator people
Young Scientist and Technology Exhibition
21st-century Irish people
21st-century Irish businesspeople